Namil Bridges (born December 20, 2004), known professionally as Slump6s, is an American rapper from Rochester, New York. He is currently signed to record labels Republic Records, UMG, and Field Trip having released his projects Origin and Genesis under the labels. He is known for his single "Antisocial", a collaboration with American rapper tana.

Early life
At the age of 6, Slump6s started recording in his father's music studio taking inspiration from videos of Michael Jackson that he would obsessively watch. As a child, he would play orchestral instrumentals in a band and listen to artists the likes of XXXTentacion, Ski Mask the Slump God, and Lil Uzi Vert.

Career
He first started gaining traction with the release of his single "Antisocial" with fellow teenage rapper tana. In 2021, he released his debut mixtape Origin.  In April 2022, he and American rapper iayze began an online altercation culminating in the release of diss tracks like "3piece" and "no children 2 (I'm him)". In July 2022, he released his debut studio album Genesis with appearances from rappers Destroy Lonely and Sgpwes.
In September 2022, he appeared on KA$HDAMI's mixtape World Damination on the track "Relax".

Discography

Studio albums

Mixtapes

Extended Plays

References

External links 
 

Living people
21st-century American rappers
African-American male rappers
People from New York (state)
Rappers from New York (state)
2004 births